The IWRG Intercontinental Middleweight Championship (Campeonato Intercontinental de Peso Medio IWRGL in Spanish) is a professional wrestling championship promoted by the Mexican wrestling promotion International Wrestling Revolution Group (IWRG). Because Lucha Libre puts more emphasis on the lower weightclasses, this division is considered more important than the normally more prestigious heavyweight division of the promotion.

The current champion is Puma de Oro who defeated Tonalli for the title on October 30, 2022. Puma de Oro is the 47st overall champion and the 29th person to have held the championship. The first champion was Pantera, who defeated Tony Rivera in Naucalpan, Mexico on July 27, 1997 in the finals of a tournament. It has since been defended throughout Mexico, but primarily in Naucalpan which is the IWRG's "home ground". In November 2007 Negro Casas, who was under contract with Consejo Mundial de Lucha Libre (CMLL) but worked for IWRG under a talent sharing agreement between IWRG and CMLL, won the title. The talent sharing agreement ended in 2008 but the Middleweight championship was not declared vacant even though Negro Casas was not able to defend it. After four years of inactivity, the title was vacated and put up in a tournament in May 2012 and has been active in IWRG since.

As it is a professional wrestling championship, the championship was not won not by actual competition, but by a scripted ending to a match determined by the bookers and match makers. On occasion the promotion declares a championship vacant, which means there is no champion at that point in time. This can either be due to a storyline, or real life issues such as a champion suffering an injury being unable to defend the championship, or leaving the company.

Championship tournaments
Details of the initial tournament in July 1997 has not been verified only that Pantera II defeated Tony Rivera in the finals of an eight-man tournament.

November 2007 Championship tournament
IWRG stripped Pentagón Black of the championship and started an eight-man, single elimination tournament on October 15, 2007. The final match took place on November 1, 2007 at IWRG's annual El Castillo del Terror tournament.

May 2012 Championship tournament
The Middleweight Championship had been inactive since late 2007 until May 1, 2012 when IWRG officially announced that the championship was vacated and would be decided in an eight-man tournament that was the focal point of their May 6, 2013 Caravan de Campeones show.

Title history

Combined reigns

Footnotes

References

External links
Wrestling-titles.com
Solie.org
Cagematch.net

International Wrestling Revolution Group championships
Middleweight wrestling championships
Intercontinental professional wrestling championships